Ian Mackay Abad (born 14 July 1986) is a Spanish professional footballer who plays as a goalkeeper for Deportivo de La Coruña.

Club career
Born in A Coruña, Mackay emerged through local Deportivo de La Coruña's youth ranks, but never managed any first-team appearances, only occasionally being involved in training. In his first year as a professional he was loaned to Segunda División B clubs, AD Ceuta and AD Universidad de Oviedo, before being released in 2007 and joining another side in that tier, UD Vecindario.

In January 2008, Mackay returned to Galicia, joining lowly SD Ciudad de Santiago and helping to win promotion to the third division, with the club in a severe financial crisis. In the following summer he moved to SD Ponferradina, still in division three. He achieved promotion to Segunda División in his first season, and played his first match in the competition on 28 August 2010 by starting in a 0–0 home draw against SD Huesca.

Mackay made 23 appearances in his first season, but Ponfe were immediately relegated. On 18 July 2011 he joined CE Sabadell FC also of the second tier, serving mostly as a backup to David de Navas during his only season.

In August 2012, Mackay moved to CD Atlético Baleares in the third division. In October 2013 he joined Tercera División's CD Boiro, but signed for Racing de Ferrol in April of the following year when their three goalkeepers were injured.

Mackay made 140 total appearances for Ferrol, and after their relegation in 2017–18 he stayed in the third tier, joining Real Murcia. He returned to Sabadell in July 2019, and was a starter in the club's promotion to the second division.

On 11 June 2021, Mackay returned to Deportivo, now as a first-team player.

Personal life
Mackay was born to a Spanish mother and a Scottish father, oil worker John Cameron Mackay from Inverness, and had four older half-sisters in Aberdeen. Due to living his whole life in Spain, he did not speak English.

In February 2007, it was reported that Mackay was being tracked for the Scotland national team by manager Alex McLeish. He was a fan of Celtic, and idolised Henrik Larsson.

References

External links

1986 births
Living people
Spanish people of Scottish descent
Spanish footballers
Footballers from A Coruña
Association football goalkeepers
Segunda División players
Segunda División B players
Tercera División players
Primera Federación players
Deportivo Fabril players
AD Ceuta footballers
UD Vecindario players
SD Ponferradina players
CE Sabadell FC footballers
CD Atlético Baleares footballers
CD Boiro footballers
Racing de Ferrol footballers
Real Murcia players
Deportivo de La Coruña players